Physiphora is a genus of flies in the family Ulidiidae, containing over 30 species worldwide.

Distribution
The distribution of this genus is largely African, but a few endemic species are found in Asia as far as the Solomon Islands. Some species have been introduced into the Americas and Australasia. The species P. alceae (Preyssler) is cosmopolitan.

Selected species

 P. alceae (Preyssler, 1791)
 P. aenea (Fabricius, 1794)
 P. elbae
 P. euphorbiana Krivosheina & Krivosheina, 1997
 P. hainanensis Chen, 2007
 P. hendeli
 P. laticauda
 P. nasoni
 P. smaragdina Loew, 1852
 P. tenuis

References

 
Ulidiidae
Brachycera genera
Taxa named by Carl Fredrik Fallén